Hulchul (lit. Commotion) is a 1951 Indian Hindi-language drama film directed by S. K. Ojha and written by Hasrat Jaipuri. The film was produced by K. Asif with Mohammed Shafi-Sajjad Hussain as music directors and film song lyrics by Khumar Barabankvi. The film stars Dilip Kumar, Nargis along with K. N. Singh, Balraj Sahni, Jeevan and Yakub. It is a loose adaptation of Emily Brontë's 1847 novel Wuthering Heights.

Cast
 Dilip Kumar as Kishore (based on Heathcliff)
 Nargis as Asha (based on Catherine Earnshaw)
 K. N. Singh as Chandan, Asha's brother (based on Hindley Earnshaw)
 Balraj Sahni as Jailor
 Jeevan as Paul 
 Yakub as Gurudev
 Murad as Thakur Ajit Singh
 Sitara Devi as Madame Neelam
 Cuckoo
 Neelam as Malti
 Baby Anwari as Young Asha 
 N. Kabir as Young Chandan

Music
"Bahaar Aai, Lutaa Dil Meraa Haay Aabaad Ho Kar" - Lata Mangeshkar, lyrics by Khumar Barabankvi, music by Sajjad Hussain
"O Bichhade Hue Saathi Jiyun Kaise Bataa De" - Lata Mangeshkar, Mohammed Rafi
"Lagi Hai Aag Dil Men, Qismat Ke Sitaare Dub Gae" - Lata Mangeshkar, Mohammed Rafi
"Ek Jhuthi Si Tasalli Vo Mujhe De Ke Chale" - Lata Mangeshkar
"Aaj Mere Nasib Ne Mujhko Rula Rula Diya" - Lata Mangeshkar
"Preet Jata Ke Meet Bana Ke Bhul Na Jana" - Lata Mangeshkar, Mohammed Rafi
"Haye Sadke Tere O Banke Mere" - Lata Mangeshkar
"Koi Kis Tarah Raze Ulfat Chupaye" - Rajkumari Dubey
"So Rahe Hai Bekhaabar Sone Wale Gaon Mein" - Shamshad Begum

References

External links 
 

1951 films
Films scored by Sajjad Hussain
Films scored by Mohammed Shafi
1950s Hindi-language films
Indian drama films
1951 drama films
Indian black-and-white films
Films based on Wuthering Heights